Ferdinand "Fred" Volkert (1 April 1903 – 2 November 1953) was a Canadian boxer. He competed in the men's featherweight event at the 1928 Summer Olympics.

References

1903 births
1953 deaths
Canadian male boxers
Olympic boxers of Canada
Boxers at the 1928 Summer Olympics
Boxers from Montreal
Featherweight boxers